Pythagorean Method of Memorization (PYMOM), also known as Triangular Movement Cycle (TMC), is a game-based, educational methodology or associative-learning technique that primarily uses corresponding information, such as terms and definitions on opposing sides, displayed on cue cards, to exploit psychological retention of information for academic study and language acquisition. PYMOM is named such because of the shape the cue-cards form during the progression of the game, a right-angled or Pythagorean triangle.

It is a theoretical educational method that is made up of several established and tested educational methods that have been in use for decades.

Methodology
PYMOM is a composite body of techniques that claims, in its digital form, to incorporate (to a greater or lesser degree): spaced repetition, non-failure redundant subroutine, chromatics, positive reinforcement, the Von Restorff effect, picture association, selective musical tonality, kinesthetics, the serial-position effect and meditation. There are two branches of this methodology:
the historical, physical incarnation, the Triangular Movement Cycle and
the digitized version, incorporating the significant addition of the aforementioned educational methods and theories, Pythagorean Method of Memorization.

Process & application
As with both branches, there is only one variable in the game or learning method: a correct or incorrect answer. The initial movement cycle also remains largely unchanged.

The movement cycle which is most crucial to the methodology and reinforces the spaced repetition, begins with either 3, 4 or 5 cards; 3 cards for a 6-card session, 4 cards for a 10-card session and 5 cards for the most advanced 15-card session. Because two-sided associative cue-cards are being used, all cards are presented with a congruent side up, either all "terms" or "definitions," not mixed.

Once cards have been answered correctly, the predominant row has reached its maximum and a card must be graduated out of this row to continue the game. Thus the card to the far right comes into play.  Routines are repeated as each row reaches its maximum. A cue-card is finally eliminated from the game session by being answered correctly once more, after it has graduated to the top tier or row.

Triangular Movement Cycle

The first manifestation, referred to as the "Triangular Movement Cycle" or TMC, was a simple paper-based learning technique that was primarily a manual movement cycle using physical cue-cards, which allowed for manual-spaced repetition to elicit psychological retention of information. Its origins, however, are not very clear. Using TMC, teachers would move the cards for the student in a one-on-one setting according to either the correct or incorrect feedback from the student. This presented challenges for the teacher or tutor using this method. The first challenge lies in the fact that, although TMC lent itself well to a two-party learning group (i.e. teacher & student), it could also be done by the student themselves on their own. It was a very easy system to utilize once learned, however, it was found exceptionally difficult to teach the complex movement cycle and principles behind such to students, especially where a linguistic barrier was present. The second challenge lay in that the educator needed to create and remember innumerable cue-cards or create custom master lists in order to know the correct answers — and properly guide the student, thus progressing or digressing the card in play. TMC often failed to keep the attention of many students owing to the fact that cards were not very visually appealing. To make them so required tremendous effort — and was very time consuming.

The term "Pythagorean Method of Memorization" was coined in 2013 and officially copyrighted in October 2014 by a Canadian company named You Learn Educational Solutions & Linguistics Inc. PYMOM takes the movement cycle from TMC and remedied the challenge of teaching the movement cycle itself to students by providing a software-based solution to handling cycles by means of sub-routines prompted by the user’s input.

PYMOM wove established educational theory into the fabric of TMC to create a viable educational platform for academic and linguistic study by several means. Because spaced repetition is intrinsically part of the movement-cycle subroutines, it adds to the content and surrounding experience making it into a platform. The developers of PYMOM describe it as an “organic learning experience.” The tenets that truly allow a learning system to be a PYMOM-based system are enumerated thusly: The Von Restorff effect: for example, where it features a language, this method is employed to further aid in memory retention of the highlighted word in the phrase.

Chromatics: there are no white backgrounds where learning takes place.
Positive Reinforcement: There are no truly "wrong" responses, only mistakes. These mistakes are greeted by neutral reinforcement and "correct" responses are rewarded with positive reinforcement.
Picture Association: Visual aids should accompany concept-based material.
Selective Musical Tonality: the learning experience should always incorporate music; generally instrumental, that aids learning by increasing focus and reducing stress (which inhibits learning).
Kinesthetics: whether by utilizing a touch-screen, key board or mouse, a level of physical movement should always be present while learning to further increase retention.
The Serial Position Effect: taking breaks at specific, regular intervals to aid in learning and reduce stress levels.
Meditation: a session of meditation should be incorporated into every learning session to allow for further retention of the information.

References

Learning methods
Cognitive training